Rogue Music Alliance is an American independent record label in Vancouver, Washington. RMA was established in 2016 by Gabriel Wilson and David Staley when they discovered the need independent artists have for label services á la carte. They claim this type of model for a record label gives artists the chance to successfully bring their music to market without giving up the majority ownership in their work. RMA specializes in audio production, intelligent branding, song coaching, and social media marketing.

RMA released Lindy Conant & The Circuit Riders debut, Every Nation and John Mark McMillan's first genre No. 1 album Mercury & Lightning.

Additionally, RMA was responsible for the release of the controversial, first posthumous release by Prince Rogers Nelson, Deliverance – EP.

Discography

References

External links 
 RMA at Discogs
 RMA at Genius

American independent record labels